Unimak Island is the largest island in the Aleutian Islands chain of the U.S. state of Alaska.

Geography
It is home to Mount Shishaldin, one of the ten most active volcanoes in the world. According to the United States Census Bureau, there were 64 people living on Unimak as of the 2000 census, all of them in the city of False Pass at the eastern end of the island. Cape Lutke is a headland on the island. Cape Pankof is located at the extreme southwest of the island.

The Fisher Caldera is a volcanic crater in the west-central part of Unimak. Some characteristics include many volcanic cones and undrained lakes. It is named for Bernard Fisher, a U.S. Geological Survey geologist who was killed in Umnak Pass.

Mount Westdahl,  in elevation, is a stratovolcano of the Aleutian Range on the island situated at its western end.

Natural history
When the Alaska National Interest Lands Conservation Act was passed on 2 December 1980,  of the island was designated as wilderness. This area is managed by the United States Fish and Wildlife Service as part of the Alaska Maritime National Wildlife Refuge.

As a faunal extension of the Alaska Peninsula, Unimak has a relatively diverse assemblage of terrestrial mammals, including Alaska Peninsula brown bears and porcupine caribou.  West of Unimak Island, the largest native mammal in the Aleutians is the red fox.

Buildings
Scotch Cap Lighthouse was built in 1903 and was staffed by the US Coast Guard. On April 1, 1946, during the 1946 Aleutian Islands earthquake, the lighthouse was struck by a tsunami.

The Cape Sarichef Lighthouse and the Cape Sarichef Airport are also located on the island.

See also

Extreme points of the United States

References

Further reading
 Titanic and Nautical Resource Center
 Unimak Island: Blocks 1046 through 1049 and 1055 through 1065, Census Tract 1, Aleutians East Borough, Alaska United States Census Bureau

External links

 
Fox Islands (Alaska)
Islands of Aleutians East Borough, Alaska
Islands of Alaska